Gun Smoke is a 1931 American pre-Code Western film directed by Edward Sloman and written by Grover Jones and William Slavens McNutt. The film stars Richard Arlen, Mary Brian, Eugene Pallette, and William "Stage" Boyd. The film was released on April 11, 1931, by Paramount Pictures.

Plot
Following a killing and robbery in a big city back east, gang leader Kedge Darvas (Boyd) and some of his henchies take a train to a small western town in Idaho, with intentions of hiding out there until things cool down back in Chi or NYC, or wherever they lammed from. They are welcomed with open arms by the citizens under the impression they are there as capital investors with money to spend. Before long, Darvas figures the town is ripe for the taking and sends word for reinforcements, and each arriving train unloads a few suits and snappy-brim hats. Then they get rough, kill Sheriff Posey Meed (Oliver) and rile up the citizens, led by cowhand Brad Farley (Arlen), who had Darvas spotted for a wrong number just by the way he made moves on Sue Vancey (Brian),

Cast 
Richard Arlen as Brad Farley
Mary Brian as Sue Vancey
William "Stage" Boyd as Kedge Darvis
Eugene Pallette as Stub Wallack
Charles Winninger as Tack Gillup
Louise Fazenda as Hampsey Dell
Brooks Benedict as Spot Skee
William Arnold as Mugs Maransa
J. Carrol Naish as Mink Gordon 
Stanley Mack as Jazzy Quinn 
Guy Oliver as Sheriff Posey Meed
James Durkin as J.K. Horton
William V. Mong as 'Strike' Jackson
Anne Shirley as Horton's Daughter 
Willie Fung as Wong

References

External links 
 

1931 films
American Western (genre) films
1931 Western (genre) films
Paramount Pictures films
Films directed by Edward Sloman
American black-and-white films
1930s English-language films
1930s American films